The Ministry of Community Development, Gender and Children was a government ministry of Tanzania. Its mission is to "promote community development, gender equality, equity[,] and children rights through [the] formulation of policies, strategies[,] and guidelines in collaboration with stakeholders active in the country."

History 
The ministry was merged under John Magufuli's leadership into the Ministry of Health, Community Development, Gender, Elders and Children.

References

External links 
 

C
Tanzania
Tanzania
Women's rights in Tanzania